Robert Aitcheson Alexander (1819 – December 1, 1867) was an American breeder of Thoroughbred and Standardbred horses.

Biography
Born on a farm near Midway, Woodford County, Kentucky, he and his siblings inherited the property on his father's death.

Alexander was sent to study in England, where he earned a degree at Trinity College, Cambridge. While there he became the beneficiary of the Scottish estate of Sir William Alexander, his uncle, at Airdrie and Cowdenhill. He lived on this estate for nine years, then in 1849 returned to Kentucky.

Back home, Alexander set about establishing a stud farm, and in the early 1850s returned to Europe to spend two years studying the techniques of breeding farms in Germany, France, and England. Starting with  purchased from his family, Robert Alexander built his Woodburn Stud at Spring Station, Kentucky into the leading horse breeding operation in the United States.

Alexander purchased two African-American enslaved people, Ansel Williamson and Edward D. Brown, who were taught the business of breeding and training horses. Both became horse trainers and had careers. After being given their freedom, they remained as employees of Alexander until his death. They went on to train Kentucky Derby winners and are both inductees of the National Museum of Racing and Hall of Fame.

In February 1865, soldiers of the Confederate Army attacked the village of Midway. They burned down the railroad station, robbed its residents, and stole fifteen of Alexander's prized thoroughbred horses.

Alexander died on December 1, 1867. His brother, Alexander John Alexander (known as "A.J."), took over the management of Woodburn Stud and further enhanced its reputation.

Alexander is portrayed in best selling novel Horse by Geraldine Brooks, published in 2022, which is based upon the life of the racehorse Lexington. A depiction of the Confederate attack is included in the book.

References

Bibliography

Further reading
Detailed history of Woodburn Stud and Robert A. Alexander from the Kentucky Humanities Council, Inc., University of Kentucky (PDF)

Alumni of Trinity College, Cambridge
Businesspeople from Kentucky
American racehorse owners and breeders
People from Midway, Kentucky
American expatriates in the United Kingdom
1819 births
1867 deaths
19th-century American businesspeople
American slave owners